Oeuvrevue  is a rarities compilation album by Grant Hart, formerly of the bands Hüsker Dü and Nova Mob. It was released on 26 November 2010 by the German label Hazelwood.

The album is a collection of B-sides, live recordings, radio sessions and outtakes recorded by Grant Hart as a solo artist and as part of Nova Mob. Originally released in a limited edition of 1000 copies to coincide with Hart's fall 2010 European tour. It's not a comprehensive retrospective, with the 2541 EP being the most obvious omission. Perhaps surprisingly the Shoot EP is represented, given that Grant Hart was always critical of its release.

From the original liner notes: "Dear listener, what you are holding is a collection of rarities from my career from 1988 to 1995, with a couple of newer songs thrown in for fun listening. Mostly they were recorded for one time airplay on cool stations in Europe. Some were recorded live at clubs or in the broadcast studio. Others were outtakes that appeared on compilation discs or on singles limited to a few hundred copies." – Grant Hart

The album was rereleased on vinyl in June 2016 by Bang! Records.

Track listing

 (1, 2, 14 – 16) originally released by Grant Hart, (3–13) by Nova Mob.
 (1, 2) recorded live for BBC Radio Scotland at BBC Studios, London, England, 20 November 1989 
 (3) recorded live at La Dolce Vita, Lausanne, Switzerland, 13 May 1990
 (8, 9) recorded live by VPRO at Studio NOB Audio 1, Hilversum, Netherlands, 19 May 1994
 (10) recorded live at ARGE Nonntal, Salzburg, Austria, 14 June 1994
 (12) recorded live at the 7th Street Entry, Minneapolis, Minnesota, 4 September 1993
 (13) recorded for BBC Radio 1, London, England, August 1994

Personnel
Grant Hart – vocals, guitar, acoustic guitar (1, 2), piano (5), organ (11), drums (13), various instruments (14–16) 
Tom Merkl – bass, vocals (3–13)
Michael Crego – drums (3–5)
Marc Retish – drums (6, 7)
Chris Hesler – guitar (8–13)
Steve Sutherland – drums (8–12)

References

External links
 Oeuvrevue on Discogs.com. Retrieved on 16 February 2018.

2010 compilation albums
Grant Hart albums